Charles E. Martin Jr. (born July 20, 1961) is an American politician. He is a Republican representing the 49th district in the Georgia House of Representatives.

Martin was a City Councillor in Alpharetta, Georgia from 1993 to 1995, and mayor from 1996 to 2002. Martin has represented District 49 in the Georgia House of Representatives since 2003, and is running for reelection in 2020.

After Joe Biden won the 2020 presidential election in Georgia and Donald Trump refused to concede while making false claims of fraud, Martin supported a performance review of the top election official in Fulton County, a heavily Democratic county. There was no evidence of meaningful fraud or wrongdoing in Fulton County.

References 

Living people
Republican Party members of the Georgia House of Representatives
21st-century American politicians
1961 births